The men's freestyle 96 kilograms is a competition featured at the 2013 World Wrestling Championships, and was held at the László Papp Budapest Sports Arena in Budapest, Hungary on 16 September 2013.

Results
Legend
F — Won by fall

Finals

Top half

Section 1

Section 2

Bottom half

Section 3

Section 4

Repechage

References
Results Book, Pages 52–53

Men's freestyle 96 kg